Carson Raine Beck (born November 19) is an American football quarterback for the Georgia Bulldogs.

High school career 
Beck attended Mandarin High School in Jacksonville, Florida. During his junior season, Beck threw for 3,546 yards and 30 touchdowns, being named the 2018 Florida Mr. Football. Beck led Mandarin to a Florida State Championship, throwing for five touchdowns in the game. As a senior, he recorded 1,843 yards and 20 touchdowns on 278 completions. Beck was originally committed to Alabama before decommiting and committing to play college football at the University of Georgia.

College career 
As a freshman, Beck would enter season as the backup in a quarterback room including Stetson Bennett, JT Daniels, and D'Wan Mathis. Beck made his first appearance against Missouri in the fourth quarter. The following season, Beck threw his first career touchdown pass in a 56–7 victory over UAB. Beck played in three games, throwing for 176 yards, two touchdowns, and two interceptions. Beck entered the 2022 season as the second-string quarterback, serving as the backup for Bennett. He appeared in the first three games of the season totaling 178 yards and two touchdowns. Against Vanderbilt, Beck would tally two touchdowns and 98 yards.

References

External links 

 Georgia Bulldogs bio

Living people
Georgia Bulldogs football players
American football quarterbacks
Players of American football from Jacksonville, Florida
Mandarin High School alumni
Year of birth missing (living people)